Beorma is the name most commonly given to the circa 7th century Anglo-Saxon founder or later leader of the settlement now known as the English city of Birmingham before its first mention in 1086. At its Saxon founding the forerunner settlement was known by an unknown name or as it in Norman times came to be recorded in an established two-part form "Beorma's ham" ("homestead of...") or "Beorma-inga-ham" ("homestead of the tribe/people of/related to...").

If Beorma, or similar, is probably a relevant personal name as the majority of Anglo-Saxon historians publishing on the subject claim, it has one other known exponent, a different Anglo-Saxon figure who owned another farmstead across the far side of Wessex, that of Barton-on-Sea, Hampshire which appears twice in the Domesday Book, as Bermintune and as Burmintune, directly cognate to the entry for Birmingham.

The meaning and linguistic proximity of 'beorn', prince, coupled with the usually personal suffix -ing so correlated by following well-known names in most cases, underpins the leading theory that both places had an eponymous human leader.  However few records of such princely names containing the 'm' sound supports a counter-theory of word origin. It points to relative proximity to forests/heath clearings of multi-pointed shrubs, broom (and relatives gorse), as the origin in both cases.

Identity

As the person after whom Birmingham was named, there are three possible answers to the question of exactly who Beorma was. Beorma could have been the founder or ancestor of a tribe, the beormingas, long before its arrival in what was to become Anglo-Saxon Mercia; the ealdorman or head of a tribe or clan of kinsmen who travelled together for the purpose of migration (and who settled in Mercia); or the leader of a (possibly mercenary) group with whom he shared a contractual obligation (the frankpledge) to one of the Mercian kings.

Etymology
Beorma variously means, in Old English, "fermented", "head of beer", "yeasty" or "frothy", from which the modern English words barm and barmy are derived. The assertion that Beorma was the founder of Birmingham arose from a post-war challenge to the way Anglo-Saxon place-names had been constructed. It was not until 1940 that Eilert Ekwall noted that:

"Birmingham probably meant 'the Hamm of Beornmund’s people' (OE Beornmund-ingaham). Or the direct base may be a pet-form Beorma from Beornmund".

Ekwall's view was built on by J.M. Dodgson who went on to suggest that –ingaham settlements like Birmingham and Nottingham were signs of earlier settlement than –ing settlements like Reading and Hastings, reinforcing the idea that Birmingham itself was preceded by a tribal territory occupied by the Beormingas. According to Tom Shippey J.R.R. Tolkien went on to use the character of Beorn in The Hobbit to evoke links between elfland and the counties surrounding Birmingham.

Alternative names
As no records of the place-name exist from the Anglo-Saxon period, only the entry for Bermingham in the Domesday Book of 1086 Beorma is the most often imputed form of the name of the founder of Birmingham. A number of alternative names have been put forward (including Bearm, Berm, Beor, Bearma, Beorm and Breme), based on the fact that the city's name has been spelled in many different ways throughout its history.

Just as the other names have been put forward for the founder of Birmingham, this name may share its origins with similar Anglo-Saxon place names--Barton, Bearwood, Berwood, Bordesley, Brewood, and Burcot—all found within the environs of Birmingham. The high incidence of these place names has been used to suggest that Beorma's tribe, the beormingas, settled across the wider woodland area which formed the northern part of the Forest of Arden.

Breme or Brom
The second most common name associated with the origin of Birmingham is Breme or Brom, which could be a given name, but whose meaning is derived from the spiky shrub ‘broom’ (which was commonly found in the woodland clearings of the Forest of Arden) rather than with a given name. Birmingham has also been known as Bromwycham, and nearby towns with a similar etymology include Bromford, Little Bromwich, West Bromwich, Bromsgrove, Broomhill and several Bromleys scattered across Staffordshire and Warwickshire. By the 14th century there were so many English place-names prefixed by Brom- that differentiating names (such as Abbots Bromley, originally referred to as Bromleage in 1002 and Kings Bromley, originally known as Brom Legge) were adopted.

Beorma and the B-Line
If Beorma is a diminutive of Beornmund (Beorn = 'prince'; Mund = 'hand') then the name would mean either "Princely protector" or "the Prince's hand". This interpretation would suggest that Beorma was a royal name, or else the name of a king's thegn. A royal connection for the founder of an early tribe whose territory is adjacent to that of the founders of Mercia draws attention to its similarity between the names Beornmund or Beorma and those of the alleged B-line of Mercian kings noted by Dr. Barbara Yorke that included Beornred, Beornwulf, Beorhtwulf and Burgred.

Beorma in recent times
The name Beorma has been used to establish and promote links with the city of Birmingham on a number of occasions, evolving from an academic assumption about an etymological source into an established character, albeit mythical, which has come to symbolise Birmingham's Anglo-Saxon foundation.

Arch of the Beorma Tribe
In 2002 Birmingham's medieval history was commemorated by the placement of a set of ornate rolled steel memorial arches in Gooch Street on a bridge over the River Rea in the suburb of Highgate by artist Steve Field, which reflect upon the foundation of the city and on modern Highgate's local identity. The memorial says "near this river crossing an Anglian tribe led by Beorma founded Birmingham".

Beowulf Brewery

A micro-brewery founded in the city's Yardley suburb in 1996 (and relocated to Chasewater in 2003), the Beowulf Brewing Company established a series of Anglo-Saxon brands for its beers, most of which had thematic links to the legend of Beowulf. One of these beers, a pale session bitter, was instead named after Beorma to commemorate the city in which the brewery was founded.

Beorma Quarter
The "Beorma Quarter" is planned for construction from 2010 onwards, as a multimillion-pound 30-storey city-within-a-city development on a site at the end of Digbeth High Street, directly opposite Birmingham's Selfridges building (it will occupy the site of the city's last seven burgage plots). Complete with state-of-the-art environmental and energy systems, the final development is likely to consist of a Marriott Hotel, apartments, green spaces, a niche shopping centre, a public space originally intended to house Birmingham's historic John F. Kennedy memorial, and two refurbished cold storage buildings which will be redeveloped as creative industries business incubation and innovation hubs.

Literary, artistic and musical works
Toccata Beorma
In 1972, following the receipt of his honorary doctorate from the University of Birmingham, broadcaster and Birmingham City Organist George Thalben-Ball wrote 'Toccata Beorma' as a celebration of his links with the city.

Tribe of Beorma
In 2000 the Women & Theatre company embarked on a national tour to celebrate the millennium by performing a new musical play, Tribe of Beorma, by Janice Connolly.

What is Missing from your Life? The Men
On 5 March 2007 Radio 4's Afternoon Play by Stephanie Dale recounted the fictional story of Beorma, interweaving it with true stories of men who lived and worked in Birmingham.

References

City founders
History of Birmingham, West Midlands
Mercian people
Anglo-Saxon thegns
Legendary English people